The dorsal cuneocuboid ligament consists of fibrous bands that connect the dorsal surfaces of the cuboid and lateral surfaces of the cuneiform bones.

Foot
Ligaments